The 1981 Maghreb Athletics Championships was the eighth edition of the international athletics competition between the countries of the Maghreb. Algeria, Tunisia and Libya were the competing nations. Organised by the Union des Fédérations d'Athlétisme du Maghreb Uni (Union of Athletics Federations of the United Maghreb), it took place in Casablanca, Morocco from 15–17 July. A total of 39 athletics events were contested, 23 for men and 16 for women.

The 1981 edition marked a rejuvenation of the tournament, there having been a six-year gap since the last edition. It was the second time that Algiers played host to the championships, and also the second time Libya sent a team. With Morocco absent, the hosts, Algeria, were dominant at the competition, winning a total of 29 gold medals. Tunisia had nine gold medals, and Libya took the sole remaining gold medal.

The women's heptathlon was introduced, replacing the women's pentathlon in line with the new international standard set at the 1983 World Championships in Athletics. A women's 400 metres hurdles and Maghreb men's marathon were also staged for the first time. Track events were only officially timed to the tenth of a second.

Medal summary

Men

Women

References

Champions
Les championnats maghrebins d athletisme. Union Sportive Oudja. Retrieved on 2015-02-20.

Maghreb Athletics Championships
International athletics competitions hosted by Algeria
Sport in Algiers
Maghreb Athletics Championships
Maghreb Athletics Championships
20th century in Algiers